Taking Pictures may refer to:

Taking Pictures (novel), short stories by Irish Author Anne Enright
Taking Pictures (play), play by Marcus Lloyd
Taking Pictures (album), album by Baghdad Jones